Virginia Isabel Hernández Milachay (born 26 May 1990, in Panama City, Panama) is a Panamanian model and beauty pageant contestant winner of the Miss Panama World 2013 title on 8 January 2013 for Miss World 2013 contest. On August 1 is designated to represent Panamá in the 2016 Miss Earth pageant.

Participation in contests
She participated in the competition Miss World University Panamá 2010 and represent her country in the Miss World University 2010 in Korea where she won the Miss Congeniality.

Miss Panamá World 2013

At the end of the Miss Panamá 2013 she also received awards including Miss Congeniality.

Hernández is 5 ft 8 in (1.73 m) tall, and competed in the national beauty pageant Miss Panamá 2013. She represented the state of Panamá Centro .

Miss World 2013 

She represented Panama in the 63rd edition of the Miss World pageant held on 28 September 2013, at the Sentul International Convention Center in Indonesia.

Miss Earth 2016 

Hernández represented Panama at Miss Earth 2016 where she failed to place. The Miss Earth crown was won by Katherine Espín of Ecuador.

See also
 Miss Panamá 2013
 Miss Panamá 2016
 Carolina Brid
 Keity Mendieta

References

External links
Panamá 2013 official website
Miss Panamá

1990 births
Living people
Panamanian beauty pageant winners
Panamanian female models
Miss World 2013 delegates
Miss Earth 2016 contestants
Señorita Panamá